Maxi Ultra•Fresh is a 2005 remix album featuring the music of Freezepop. Though hard copies of the album are currently out of print, the album is available through iTunes and other digital download services. The first three songs on the album are not remixes, and are identical to the versions found on Fancy Ultra•Fresh.

Track listing

Freezepop albums
2005 remix albums